The Sobral Formation is a palaeontological formation located in Antarctica. It dates to the Danian stage of the Lower Paleocene period.

Spectacular fossils documenting marine and terrestrial ecosystems soon after the (non-avian) dinosaurs became extinct at the Cretaceous-Paleogene boundary are found in this formation. One of the most significant sites is on Seymour Island.

See also 

 List of fossiliferous stratigraphic units in Antarctica
 List of fossil sites

References

Further reading 
 
 
 

Geologic formations of Antarctica
Cenozoic Antarctica
Paleocene Series
Paleogene System of Antarctica
Danian Stage
Siltstone formations
Mudstone formations
Shallow marine deposits
Graham Land